Regarding the as-told-to autobiography All God's Dangers The Life of Nate Shaw, see Ned Cobb.

Nathaniel "Nate" Shaw (born May 20, 1945) is a former American football defensive back in the National Football League for the Los Angeles Rams. Shaw also was an assistant coach for several college football teams.

Playing career
Shaw was born in San Diego, California and graduated from Abraham Lincoln High School. He went on to play college football at USC, where he was a defensive back and was named to the All-Pac-10 team in 1965 and was a consensus All-American in 1966. He was drafted in the fifth round of the 1967 NFL Draft by the Los Angeles Rams and played two seasons with the Rams.

Coaching career
After retiring from playing football, Shaw coached defensive backs at Oregon State from 1976 to 1979, and then at his alma mater USC for 7 years from 1980 to 1986.

Personal life
Following his coaching career, Shaw worked in hotel sales and ran a plumbing business. He is the brother of former NFL and college assistant coach Willie Shaw and the uncle of current Stanford head coach David Shaw.

References

1945 births
Living people
All-American college football players
Los Angeles Rams players
Oregon State Beavers football coaches
Players of American football from San Diego
USC Trojans football coaches
USC Trojans football players